The Malakal Power Plant is a fossil fuel power station in Koror, Palau.

History
The first unit of the power plant was commissioned in 1982 with a capacity of 1.25 MW.

Generation units
Currently the power plant consists of 8 installed diesel generators with a total installed capacity of 23.7 MW.

References

1982 establishments in Oceania
Energy infrastructure completed in 1982
Oil-fired power stations in Palau